The Cybernetics Society is a UK-based learned society that exists to promote the understanding of Cybernetics. The core activity of the Cybernetics Society is the organization and facilitation of scientific meetings, conferences, and social events. The society's website provides information and news items for professionals in the field and the general audience in order to improve the understanding of cybernetics and associated disciplines. Among the activities of the Society are:

 Annual Conference: Annual conferences of the Cybernetics Society are held since 1973.
 CYBCOM: CYBCOM is a Cybernetics discussion group.
 Fellows of the Cybernetics Society: Some of the numerous fellows are Ranulph Glanville, Charles Hampden-Turner, Mick Ashby (Ethical regulator), Dr D.J. Stewart (Nudge theory), Dr James Wilk (Nudge theory), Dr Martin Smith and Dr David Dewhurst.
 Honorary fellows : Among those awarded by the Cybernetics Society are: Eric Ash, Anthony Stafford Beer, Margaret Boden, James W. Black, John Carew Eccles, James Lovelock, Roger Penrose, Horace Barlow and Abdus Salam. Recent awardees include Stephen Brewis, David Deutsch, Fredmund Malik, Humberto Maturana and Kevin Warwick. 
 Kybernetes: The Society is working together with the World Organisation of Systems and Cybernetics on Kybernetes, The international journal of cybernetics, systems and management sciences.
IFSR: They are a member of the International Federation for Systems Research.

References

External links 
 Cybernetics Society homepage
 Cambridge Cybernetic Society a related British society
 Kybernetes

Cybernetics
Learned societies of the United Kingdom
Organizations established in 1968
Systems science societies
1968 establishments in the United Kingdom